Jesenice is a town in Prague-West District in the Central Bohemian Region of the Czech Republic. It has about 9,800 inhabitants.

Administrative parts
Villages of Horní Jirčany, Osnice and Zdiměřice are administrative parts of Jesenice.

Geography
Jesenice is located south of Prague, in its immediate vicinity. Most of the municipal territory lies in the Prague Plateau. The streams Botiš and Jesenický flows through the territory and supply several small ponds.

History
The first written mention of Jesenice is from 1088.

In 2015 the municipality was promoted to a town and lost the title of the "largest village" in the Czech Republic.

Demographics
Thanks to its proximity to Prague, Jesenice belongs to the fastest growing municipalities in the country in the 21st century.

Transport
The D0 motorway runs next to the town.

References

External links

Cities and towns in the Czech Republic
Populated places in Prague-West District